Kal Gechi (also Romanized as Kal Gechī and Kal Gachī; also known as Gol Gachī) is a village in Milas Rural District, in the Central District of Lordegan County, Chaharmahal and Bakhtiari Province, Iran. At the 2006 census, its population was 310, in 61 families.

References 

Populated places in Lordegan County